Shawnigan Lake Water Aerodrome  is located on Shawnigan Lake,  south of the village of Shawnigan Lake, British Columbia, Canada.

See also
 List of airports on Vancouver Island

References

Seaplane bases in British Columbia
Cowichan Valley
Registered aerodromes in British Columbia